Amyloid-like protein 1, also known as APLP1, is a protein that in humans is encoded by the APLP1 gene. APLP1 along with APLP2 are important modulators of glucose and insulin homeostasis.

Function 

This gene encodes a member of the highly conserved amyloid precursor protein gene family. The encoded protein is a membrane-associated glycoprotein that is cleaved by secretases in a manner similar to amyloid beta A4 precursor protein cleavage. This cleavage liberates an intracellular cytoplasmic fragment that may act as a transcriptional activator. The encoded protein may also play a role in synaptic maturation during cortical development. Alternatively spliced transcript variants encoding different isoforms have been described.

APLP1 and APLP2 double knockout mice display hypoglycemia and hyperinsulinemia indicating that these two proteins are important modulators of glucose and insulin homeostasis.

References

External links

Further reading